Laffly was a French manufacturer of trucks and utility vehicles. Founded in 1849, the Laffly company began manufacturing utility vehicles in Billancourt in 1912. From the mid-1930s and until World War II, the company also manufactured a range of offroad military vehicles such as the Laffly S15 and Laffly V15.

Probably best remembered today for its firetrucks, the Laffly company closed shop during the early 1950s.

Sources
 https://web.archive.org/web/20070407141804/http://www.bernistrucks.fr/actualite/actu_0305.php

External links
 https://web.archive.org/web/20080112140803/http://amispfbleau.club.fr/psftb.htm Laffly 1937 firetruck
 https://web.archive.org/web/20061124114209/http://musee-pompiers.asso.fr/fiches/vehicules-h006.htm Laffly 1939 firetruck

Defunct motor vehicle manufacturers of France
Truck manufacturers of France
Vintage vehicles